Slobodan is a Serbo-Croatian masculine given name which means "free" (sloboda /  meaning "freedom, liberty") used among other South Slavs as well. It was coined by Serbian liberal politician Vladimir Jovanović who, inspired by John Stuart Mill's essay On Liberty baptised his son as Slobodan in 1869 and his daughter Pravda (Justice) in 1871. It became popular in both Kingdom of Yugoslavia (1918–1945) and the Socialist Federal Republic of Yugoslavia (1945–1991) among various ethnic groups within Yugoslavia and therefore today there are also Slobodans among Croats, Slovenes and other Yugoslav peoples.
 
During the decade after World War II, the name Slobodan (means "freedom") became the most popular Serbian male name, and it remained so until 1980.

Common derived nicknames are Sloba, Slobo, Boban, Boba, Bobi and Čobi.

The feminine counterpart is Slobodanka.

It may refer to:

Slobodan Aligrudić (1934–1985), Serbian actor
Slobo Ilijevski (1949-2008), Macedonian-American goalkeeper in the North American Soccer and Major Indoor Soccer Leagues
Slobodan Jovanović (1869–1958), Serbian politician during World War II
Slobodan Kačar (born 1957), retired Serbian boxer
Slobodan Komljenović (born 1971), retired German-born Yugoslav footballer
Slobodan Lalović (born 1954), Serbian politician
Slobodan Milošević (1941–2006), former president of Yugoslavia and Serbia
Slobodan Nikić (born 1983), Serbian water polo player, Olympic champion
Slobodan Novak (born 1924), Croatian writer
Slobodan Obradov (1918–2013), Serbian physician
Slobodan Praljak (1945–2017), Croatian writer, director and one of the leaders of  Herzeg-Bosnia during the War in Bosnia and Herzegovina
Slobodan Prosperov Novak (born 1951), Croatian writer
Slobodan Rajković (born 1989), Serbian football player
Slobodan Rakitić (born 1940), Serbian writer and politician
Slobodan Santrač (born 1946), Serbian football manager
Slobodan Šijan (born 1946), Serbian film director
Slobodan Šnajder (born 1948), Croatian writer
Slobodan Subotić (born 1956), Montenegro-born Slovenian basketball player
Slobodan Uzelac (born 1947), Croatian politician representing Serbs of Croatia, member of Prime Minister Jadranka Kosor's cabinet
Slobodan Vuksanović (born 1965), Serbian poet, essayist, translator and politician
Slobodan Živojinović (born 1963), former Serbian tennis player

See also

Serbian names

References

Masculine given names
Slavic masculine given names
Bosnian masculine given names
Serbian masculine given names